Kelly Pratt is an arranger and multi-instrumentalist best known for his horn work in the band Beirut and with David Byrne.

Biography
Born in Lexington, Kentucky, Pratt has been a member of Beirut since the band's relocation to Brooklyn, playing in the live band and on the recordings. He joined Montreal's Arcade Fire on their Neon Bible world tour in 2007–2008, playing trumpet, flugelhorn, euphonium, French horn and flute. Pratt has also been an arranger and musical director for David Byrne & St. Vincent, leading the brass section for the tour promoting their album Love This Giant. He is currently arranger and conductor for Father John Misty. 

In addition to the previous bands he has performed and/or recorded with Coldplay, LCD Soundsystem, Passion Pit, James Iha, Owen Pallett, The War on Drugs, The Antlers, Lonnie Holley, and Anthony Braxton, amongst others. 

Pratt is the singer and chief songwriter of Bright Moments, a Brooklyn-based indie rock band. Their debut album Natives was released February 21, 2012 on Luaka Bop.

Selected discography
 Beirut – The Lon Gisland EP (2006)
 Bishop Allen – Bishop Allen and the Broken String (2007)
 Beirut – The Flying Club Cup (2007)
 Escort – Love in Indigo (2007)
 Herman Düne – Giant (2007)
 Coldplay – Prospekt's March (2008)
 Team B – Team B (2009)
 Herman Düne – Next Year in Zion (2008)
 Arcade Fire – Mirroir Noir (2009)
 Beirut – March of the Zapotec (2009)
 The Maccabees – Wall of Arms (2009)
 Amanda Blank – I Love You (2009)
 A Camp – Colonia (2009)
 Emilie Simon – The Big Machine (2009)
 Harlem Shakes – Technicolor Health (2009)
 Beirut – The Rip Tide (2011)
 Escort – Escort (2011)
 Alexi Murdoch – Towards the Sun (2011)
 Emilie Simon – Franky Knight (2011)
 Bright Moments – Natives (2012)
 Passion Pit – Gossamer (2012)
 David Byrne & St. Vincent – Love This Giant (2012)
 James Iha – Look to the Sky (2012)
 LCD Soundsystem – Shut Up and Play the Hits (2012) 
 Bonobo – The North Borders (2013)
 The Pains of Being Pure at Heart – Days of Abandon (2014)
 Peter Silberman – Impermanence (2017)
 Los Campesinos! – Sick Scenes (2017)
 The Pains of Being Pure at Heart – The Echo of Pleasure (2017)

References

External links
 
 
 Team B on Myspace

Brass musicians
Musicians from Lexington, Kentucky
Living people
Year of birth missing (living people)
Beirut (band) members